Killellan House was a mansion house at Conie Glen, Kintyre, Scotland. Gutted by fire, the house was demolished in the 1960s, however the entrance lodge and gateway remain. The Killellan estate was held by the MacEacharn family from the 15th century, until controlled by the Earl of Argyll, with the estate coming back the MacEachan family in the late 17th century.

Notes

References

External links
Photo

Former buildings and structures in Scotland
Kintyre